Tatiana Kyriushyna ( born 1989) is a Ukrainian handball player for Turkish club Zağnos SK.

She was with the Czech teams DHK Zora Olomouc and TJ Házená Jindřichův Hradec before she moved to Turkey playing for Trabzon HK and then for Zağnos SK.

References

1989 births
Ukrainian female handball players
Ukrainian expatriate sportspeople in the Czech Republic
Ukrainian expatriate sportspeople in Turkey
Expatriate handball players in Turkey
Zağnos SK (women's handball) players
Living people